Jérôme Salle (born 1971) is a French film director and screenwriter.

Salle directed the films Anthony Zimmer, the Belgian comic book adaptation Largo Winch, and its sequel Largo Winch II. His 2013 film Zulu was selected as the closing film at the 2013 Cannes Film Festival. The film The Tourist (2010), written and directed by Florian Henckel von Donnersmarck, was based on Salle's screenplay for Anthony Zimmer and grossed US$278 million worldwide.

Filmography

References

External links 

 
 

French film producers
French male screenwriters
French screenwriters
Living people
French film directors
1967 births